Les Pieds Nickelés (French for "The nickel plated feet") is a French comic series, originally created by Louis Forton.  The comic premiered on June 4, 1908 in the newspaper L'Épatant, published by Société Parisienne d'Édition. It is considered to be one of the earliest French comics and one of the longest-running. It centers on a group of anarchist youth getting in trouble. In French informal speech of the early twentieth century, "nickel-plated feet" was a moniker for slackers, work-shy people.

History 

The story features three main characters named Croquignol, Filochard, and Ribouldingue, three brothers who are good hearted but at the same time are indolent crooks and slackers, characteristics of anarchists.

Les Pieds Nickelés was originally drawn in text comics format, with the text written beneath the images. Louis Forton had to struggle with his editors to use actual speech balloons, as was common in American comics.

At the beginning of their "career", the 'nickel-plated feet' constantly clash with the police in various adventures where they rarely have the upper hand. Gradually, as the comic book became increasingly popular, the Pied-Nickelés gain widened scope, complexity, and audacity. Over time, they are seen rubbing shoulders with the elite of their time, such as the President of France, the King of England, and the Kaiser of Germany.

With the arrival of First World War, the personalities of the Pied-Nickelés takes a new turn. They embody the popular French values of ingenuity and resourcefulness known as "System D". Operating behind the enemy lines under multiple guises, they constantly fool the "Boches" (French derogatory nickname for the Germans), portrayed like big heavy oafs without any finesse and easily fooled.

Louis Forton continued to draw the Pied Nickelés until his death in 1934, after which the series was taken over by Aristide Perré and Albert Badert. However, it was not until Pellos took over in 1948 that the Nickelés returned to success. The successive authors of the Nickelés thus changed the comics and evolved the comics in new directions.

In 2010, Onapratut publishes a compilation of the contributions of Michel Baril, Aurélien Bédéneau, Fabien Bertrand, Paul Burckel, Ced, Clotka, Dib, François Duprat, Frédéric Duprat, Elric, Filak, Stéphane Girod and Olivier Ka. , Lommsek, Alejandro Milà, Pasto, Radi, Loïc Senan, Thibaut Soulcié, Unter, Waltch, Wayne, Wouzit, Carali, Caza, Hardy, Hugot, Lamorthe, Laurel, Thierry Martin, O'Groj, Obion, Nancy Peña, Jeff Pourquié, Olivier Schwartz, Al Séverin, Walthéry, and Wasterlain. The cover design is the work of Pascal Rabaté.

Derivatives and parodies 

In French informal speech of the early twentieth century, "nickel-plated feet" was a moniker for slackers, workshy people. The meaning extended later to include in the 21st century characters not very commendable, conspiracy minded, rogue, both dishonest and clumsy. For example, this expression was used by the media in the Clearstream affair, where it was widely used to describe the various protagonists. The same was true of the operation of the "Ark of Zoe".

Les Pieds Nickelés also inspired a 1972 magazine where the cartoonist Régis Loisel made his debut.

In 2011, the cartoonist Luz replaced the headband of the one-eyed character Filochard with adjustable sunglasses.

Chronology of authors 
Louis Forton lead the publication under a pen name. In 1934, he decided to focus on other projects, and let someone take over.
 Louis Forton (1908-1934), créateur de la série. Louis Tybalt temporarily took over during the first world war.
 Aristide Perré (1936-1938)
 Badert (1940)
 René Pellos (1948-1981) with Roland de Montaubert as principal writer
 Pierre Lacroix (1953-1954) 
 Jacarbo (1982-1983) et Serge Saint-Michel (1954-1984)
 Jicka (1984-1988)
 Laval, Claderes, Gen-Clo (1988)

Starting from 1991, a series of new "Pieds Nickeles" to represent the "New Adventures" premiered, a collaboration of multiple publishers.
 
 Michel Rodrigue (1991-1992) - Les nouvelles aventures des Pieds Nickelés (Studio Cadero - Vents d'Ouest)
 Juillard (1999) - Le dernier chapitre (Tome 3) Les Pieds Nickelés : demain sera un autre jour (Dargaud)
 Trap et Stéphane Oiry (2009) - La Nouvelle Bande des Pieds nickelés (Delcourt)
 Un ouvrage collectif (2010) - Les Nouveaux Pieds nickelés (Onapratut)
 Philippe Riche (2011) (Vents d'Ouest - Georges Ventillard)
 Richard Malka, Ptiluc et Luz (2011) (Vents d'Ouest - Georges Ventillard)
 Corteggiani et Herlé (2012) (éditions de l'Opportun)
 Gérald Forton et Julien Moca (2013) (l'àpart éditions)
 Jihel pour des planches d'hommage tirées à part en sérigraphie pour le support carte postale.
 TIBERI JP (scénario) et Bévé (Dessin) - éditions REGARDS (Les Pieds Nickelés à Manounouland - 2014)
 TIBERI JP (Scénario) et Bévé (Dessin) - éditions REGARDS (Les Pieds Nickelés et le mystère du crâne de cristal - 2015)
 TIBERI JP (Scénario) et Bévé (Dessin) - éditions REGARDS (Les Pieds Nickelés - Aventures dans les îles - 2016)
 TIBERI JP (Scénario) et Bévé (Dessin) - éditions REGARDS (Les pieds Nickelés - Comminges... Nous voilà ! - 2017)

Main Characters 
The comics center on 3 principal protagonists, Croquignol, Filochard, and Ribouldingue, who evolve greatly over the run of the comics. Under the authorship of Louis Forton, all drawn to the same size and proportions with Croquignol being the leader of the trio. All three, under the purview of Pellos developed their own personalities: 
 Ribouldingue is the sympathetic one.
 Filochard: has a small stature; possesses one eye and gains Herculean strength when angry     
 Croquignol is a fine person and usually the leader of the band.

Although they disguise themselves regularly, they also have the same recurrent style:
 Croquignol wears the monocle, a small hat, a jacket, and a bow tie;
 Ribouldingue wears the green cap, matching the green sweater, and a red scarf around the neck.
 Filochard wears the beret, a red turtleneck and a black jacket.

Among the recurring characters of the series, one crosses in some episodes:
 Manounou, the African wife of Ribouldingue, an accomplice of the various larcenies of his legitimate and acolytes.
One finds also again, among the traditional foes:
 le commissaire Croquenot
 l'inspecteur Duflair
 Fantômard
 la Clique (autrefois un allié des pieds nickelés, puis le complice de Fantômard)
 les Cagoulards (sbires de Fantômard)
The travels of the Les Pieds Nickelés generally crosses the paths of the rich, the bourgeois, the peasants, who are distinguished by their stupidity and naivety, making them the privileged prey of the nickel-plated feet. The representatives of the public forces are also among the regular characters, regularly in the series of opponents of the three companions.

Gallery

Albums

Société Parisienne d'Édition
These albums and compilations were published by Société Parisienne d'Édition.

Pre-war albums (1929-1940) 
 Les Pieds nickelés se débrouillent 
 Toujours de nouveaux exploits 
 Ollé ! Ollé ! Soyons gais !  
 Sur les bords de la Riviera 
 Encore d'extraordinaires équipées  
 L'Audace des Pieds nickelés
 Les Pieds nickelés en Amérique  
 Attractions sensationnelles
 Les Pieds nickelés ont le filon
 La vie est belle  
 Faut pas s'en faire 
 Dans le maquis  
 Les Pieds nickelés ont la guigne ! 
 Les Pieds nickelés chez les gangsters  
 Les Pieds nickelés s'évadent
 Les Pieds nickelés rois du caoutchouc 
 Les Pieds nickelés sous les eaux  
 Les Pieds nickelés radio-reporters  
 Les Pieds nickelés prince d'Orient

Post-war albums (1946-1988) 
These were published by Société Parisienne d'Édition.

(These albums are published in the collection "Les Beaux Albums de la jeunesse joyeuse")
 Les Pieds nickelés se débrouillent  
 Des exploits formidables  
 Ollé ! Ollé! Soyons gais!  
 Sur les bords de la Riviera  
 Encore d'extraordinaires équipées  
 L'Audace des Pieds nickelés
 Les Pieds nickelés en Amérique  
 Attractions sensationnelles 
 Les Pieds nickelés sont irrésistibles 
 La vie est belle  
 Les Pieds nickelés ont la belle vie 
 Les Pieds nickelés font fortune  
 Les Pieds nickelés sportifs  
 Les Pieds nickelés dans le maquis 
 Les Pieds nickelés au Colorado  
 Les Pieds nickelés soldats  
 Les Pieds nickelés as du contre-espionnage  
 Les Pieds nickelés au lycée  
 Les Pieds nickelés chercheurs d'or  
 Le Triomphe des Pieds nickelés
 Les Pieds nickelés industriels 
 Le Trésor des Pieds nickelés
 Le Rêve des Pieds nickelés
 Les Pieds nickelés et le Parfum sans nom  
 Les Pieds nickelés et le Ratascaphe 
 Les Pieds nickelés s'évadent  
 Les Pieds nickelés en Angleterre 
 Les Pieds nickelés footballeurs  
 Les Pieds nickelés au Tour de France  
 Les Pieds nickelés en pleine bagarre  
 Les Pieds nickelés à Chicago  
 Les Pieds nickelés contre les gangsters (Les Pieds nickelés détectives privés)  
 Les Pieds nickelés courent la Panasiatique  
 Les Pieds nickelés font boum  
 Les Pieds nickelés en pleine Corrida 
 Les Pieds nickelés aux Jeux olympiques  
 Les Pieds nickelés rois du pétrole  
 Les Pieds nickelés ne veulent pas se faire rouler  
 Les Pieds nickelés super-champions de la pêche 
 Les Pieds nickelés et leur fusée atomique  
 Les Pieds nickelés trappeurs 
 Les Pieds nickelés chez les réducteurs de tête  
 Les Pieds nickelés aux pays des Incas  
 Les Pieds nickelés cinéastes, douaniers, pharmaciens  
 Les Pieds nickelés policiers de la route  
 Les Pieds nickelés diseurs de bonne aventure 
 Les Pieds nickelés au pays des pharaons  
 Les Pieds nickelés et leur soupière volante  
 Les Pieds nickelés journalistes  
 Les Pieds nickelés organisateurs de voyage  
 Les Pieds nickelés sur Bêta 2  
 Les Pieds nickelés tiennent le succès  
 Les Pieds nickelés en plein suspense  
 Les Pieds nickelés agents secrets  
 Les Pieds nickelés sur les trétaux  
 Les Pieds nickelés ministres  
 Les Pieds nickelés voyagent  
 Les Pieds nickelés font du cinéma  
 Les Pieds nickelés contre Croquenot  
 Les Pieds nickelés dans le cambouis 
 Les Pieds nickelés dans l'immobilier 
 Les Pieds nickelés à l'ORTF  
 Les Pieds nickelés campeurs 
 Les Pieds nickelés aux sports d'hiver
 Les Pieds nickelés se blanchissent 
 Les Pieds nickelés et le contrôle des changes  
 Les Pieds nickelés contre les Pieds nickelés
 Les Pieds nickelés organisateurs de safaris 
 Les Pieds nickelés cambrioleurs  
 Les Pieds nickelés esthéticiens 
 Les Pieds nickelés hippies  
 Les Pieds nickelés contre les fantômes  
 Les Pieds nickelés sur la route du pétrole  
 Les Pieds nickelés et l'Opération congélation  
 Les Pieds nickelés percepteurs  
 Les Pieds nickelés chez Zigomar II 
 Les Pieds nickelés cascadeurs 
 Les P.N et leur fils adoptif 
 Les Pieds nickelés contre les kidnappeurs (réed. du 30) 
 Les Pieds nickelés artisans
 Les Pieds nickelés justiciers 
 Les Pieds nickelés vétérinaires 
 Les Pieds nickelés à Hollywood  
 Les Pieds nickelés sous-mariniers 
 Les Pieds nickelés gens du voyage 
 Les Pieds nickelés dans le harem 
 Les Pieds nickelés et l'Énergie  
 Les Pieds nickelés sont honnêtes 
 Les Pieds nickelés producteurs  
 Les Pieds nickelés préhistoriens 
 Les Pieds nickelés aux grandes manœuvres 
 Les Pieds nickelés en Guyane  
 Les Pieds nickelés rempilent  
 Les Pieds nickelés à l'Opéra  
 Les Pieds nickelés s'expatrient 
 Les Pieds nickelés en Afrique 
 Les Pieds nickelés réforment 
 Le Casse des Pieds nickelés
 Les Pieds nickelés profitent des vacances 
 Les Pieds nickelés sportifs  
 Les Pieds nickelés ont de la chance 
 Les Pieds nickelés filoutent 
 Les Pieds nickelés jouent et gagnent
 Les Pieds nickelés pompiers  
 Les Pieds nickelés au cirque  
 Les Pieds nickelés contre Cognedur  
 Les Pieds nickelés en Auvergne  
 Les Pieds nickelés en Périgord 
 Les Pieds nickelés dans le Grand Nord  
 Les Pieds nickelés Européens
 Les Pieds nickelés capteurs d'énergie  
 Les Pieds nickelés et le Chanvre berrichon 
 Les Pieds nickelés et le Raid Paris-Tombouctou 
 Les Pieds nickelés banquiers 
 Les Pieds nickelés marins-pêcheurs 
 Les Pieds nickelés vulcanologues 
 Les Pieds nickelés à la Une  
 Les Pieds nickelés toubibs de nuit  
 Les Pieds nickelés et les Loubards
 Les Pieds nickelés contre la pollution 
 Les Pieds nickelés en voient de toutes les couleurs 
 Les Diamants de l'empereur 
 Les Pieds nickelés sculpteurs  
 Les Pieds nickelés ont de la réserve 
 Les Pieds nickelés et la Dame de fer 
 Les Pieds nickelés font la fête

Collections 
 Les Pieds nickelés au mondial
 Les Pieds nickelés et le Club
 Les Pieds nickelés et le Rallye
 Les Pieds nickelés karatekas
 Les Pieds nickelés font le tour
 Les Pieds nickelés aux jeux

Other publications

Vents d'Ouest 
(Les Nouvelles Aventures des Pieds nickelés) 
 L'Empire d'essence (1991)
 Voleur de pub (1991)
 Flouze artistique (1992)

Out of circulation 
Other publishers have released albums.
 Les Pieds nickelés dans les Corbières, à Canet-plage, sur le Lydia
 Les Fourberies des Pieds nickelés
 Les Pieds nickelés à l'ORTF

Derivative Works 
The series have been adapted by other publishers to publish.
 Les Pieds nickelés, une aventure de Croquignol, Filochard & Ribouldingue (2011)

Delcourt 
Titled La Nouvelle Bande des Pieds nickelés
 Pas si mal logés (2009)
 Bio-profiteurs (2010)
 Expulsés volontaires (2012)

Onapratut 
 Les Nouveaux Pieds nickelés (2010)

De Varly Éditions 
 Les Pieds nickelés se débrouillent (1929-2011)
 Toujours de nouveaux exploits (1929-2012)
 Le Roman des Pieds nickelés T3 (1914-2011)
 Biographie de Forton, l'histoire par la bande (2011)

Glénat 
 Promoteurs du paradis (2011)

Éditions de l'Opportun 
 Ensemble, tout est possible (2012)

Éditions l'Àpart 
 Les Pieds Nickelés visitent les châteaux de la Loire (2013)

Vents d'Ouest 
(Le Meilleur des Pieds nickelés)
 Menteurs, Voleurs, Bagarreurs... de vrais professionnels !
 Embrouilles, Arnaques et Cocards... l'aventure continue !
 Tricheurs, Hâbleurs, Manipulateurs... les affaires reprennent !
 Impostures, Esbroufes et Grosses Galères... les rebelles courent toujours ! 
 Taloches, Traquenards et P'tites Combines... les Pieds nickelés mettent les gaz ! 
 Crocs-en-jambes et Coups fourrés... les Pieds nickelés champions de l'embrouille
 100 ans... le Meilleur des Pieds Nickelés
 Ramdam, Magouilles et Castagnes... les Pieds nickelés mettent les bouts !
 Bousculés, chahutés, malmenés... mais jamais désarçonnés !

Éditions REGARDS 
 Les Pieds Nickelés à Manounouland
 Le mystère du crâne de cristal
 Aventures dans les îles.
 Comminges... Nous voilà !

References

Bibliography 
 Jean-Paul Tibéri, Les Pieds nickelés, SEDLI, coll.« Dossiers BD », 1984. Réédition partielle Vents d'Ouest, 1996.

External links 

  Les Pieds nickelés Fanpop
  Les Pieds nickelés de A à Z 
  Les Pieds nickelés quelle histoire !
  Les Pieds nickelés de Forton selon Jean Tulard
  Les Pieds nickelés sur Krinein : 1908-2008

French comics
1908 comics debuts
Humor comics
Satirical comics
Text comics
Fictional beggars
Fictional hoboes
Fictional French people
Male characters in comics
Comics set in France
Comics set during World War I
Comics characters introduced in 1908
French comics adapted into films
Cultural depictions of Wilhelm II